Žernovice is a municipality and village in Prachatice District in the South Bohemian Region of the Czech Republic. It has about 300 inhabitants.

Administrative parts
The village of Dubovice is an administrative part of Žernovice.

References

Villages in Prachatice District